The Asian Athletics Association is the continental governing body for the sport of athletics in Asia. It is headquartered in Singapore. It organises the Asian Championships in Athletics and other continental competitions.

The current president Qatari Dahlan Jumaan al-Hamad, who was elected to the position in 2013. Suresh Kalmadi of India was the president from 2000 to 2013.

Competitions
Asian Athletics Championships
Asian Indoor Athletics Championships
Asian Junior Athletics Championships
Asian Youth Athletics Championships
Asian Cross Country Championships
Asian Athletics Grand Prix Series
Asian Marathon Championship
Asian Race Walking Championships
Asian All Star Athletics Meet

Member associations

References

External links
Official website

Athletics organizations
Sports governing bodies in Asia
Organizations based in Bangkok
International organizations based in Thailand